Yaguas is a district of the Putumayo Province in Peru, and one of the four districts that comprise that province.

History 
Yaguas was part of Maynas Province until April 10, 2014 when it was created as District by Law N° 30186 as part of Putumayo Province.

Geography
The district has a total land area of  18 059,27 km². Its administrative center is located 107 meters above sea level.

Boundaries

Authorities 
The current mayor of the district is Juan Ferreyra Ahuanari (Movimiento Integración Loretana).

See also 
 Administrative divisions of Peru
 Yagua language

References

External links
 Municipalidad Distrital de Rosa Panduro - City council official website (in Spanish)
 INEI Peru (in Spanish)

Districts of the Loreto Region
Districts of the Putumayo Province